Ivo Toman (born 23 February 1966 in Frýdek-Místek) is a Czech entrepreneur and author of a number of motivational books and recordings. He founded the International Society Taxus International in the Czech Republic and expended it to Slovakia, Hungary, Germany and Italy.

Biography
Ivo Toman was born in 1966 in Frýdek-Místek. He suffered from Tourette's syndrome. At the age of 6, he contracted meningitis. Toman was often ridiculed in school due to his handicap. Learning disgusted him and he eventually changed schools. A psychology teacher motivated Toman to learn. After graduating from high school, he went to VŠLD College in Zvolen, where he graduated in 1988.

He founded the International Taxus, which operates in the fields of personal development and psychology. The enterprise began by producing  a nutritional supplement. The firm expanded to Slovakia and Hungary with other products. In 2002, he moved to Prague. He and his wife Martina Kralickova began to develop a teaching English, which in 2004 put into practice in the Czech and foreign markets.

In 2008 he was awarded inclusion in the 1000 Almanac Leaders of Czech Republic. In 2009 he won the small dolphin award from the Czech marketing company, at the 2009 Marketer of the year awards. In 2012 in Bratislava was announced as The bestselling author of 2011 by  the network bookstore Panta Rhei.

Publications

Books
 The success – "What leads to success and vice versa." – in origin: O úspěchu „co vede k úspěchu a naopak“.
 Motivation is like the smell from the outside – a book subtitled "... a few hours to ventilate" – in origin: Motivace zvenčí je jako smrad „...za pár hodin se vyvětrá“
 Unrumble head – a book subtitled "Zprimitivněte to success" – in origin: Debordelizace hlavy „Zprimitivněte k úspěchu“
 Successful selfmanipulation – a book subtitled "The Secret of inner speech" – in origin: Úspěšná sebemanipulace „Tajemství vnitřní mluvy“
 How to start a multi level marketing – nightmare or opportunity – in origin: Jak začít multi level marketing – strašák nebo příležitost
 How to build a multi level marketing – where the path leads and where not – in origin: Jak budovat multi level marketing – kudy cesta vede a kudy ne
 Machine for money – Opposition and how they – in origin: Stroj na peníze 1 – Námitky a jak na ně
 Machine for money 2 – Ferris Wheel – in origin: Stroj na peníze 2 – Ruské kolo

He also authored several motivation CDs and educational videos.

References

External links
 Ivo Toman
 The Motivation
 English self-study
 German self-study
 Web sites Taxus International

Living people
21st-century Czech businesspeople
1966 births
People from Frýdek-Místek